The Order of Timor-Leste is the highest honour currently awarded by East Timor.  Established in 2009, the order was created after the original honours granted by East Timor.  It is of a more general and broader nature than the original orders related to East Timor's independence.  The order recognises the contributions of East Timorese and foreign nationals who have made a significant contribution to East Timor, the Timorese or Mankind in general.

Criteria and award procedure
The Order of Timor-Leste is awarded to recognise and thank those individuals who have made a significant contribution for the benefit of East Timor, the Timorese, or Mankind.  This general criteria recognises such acts as:
Exceptional merit while in the performance of military duties or in the command of the armed forces while on campaign
Acts of heroism, both military and civil
Exceptional acts of sacrifice or self-denial for the benefit of the country or others
Distinguished service in the performance of duties related to public administration, in the magistracy, or diplomacy
Military service of an exceptional nature
Cultural merit, particularly in the fields of literature, science, art, or education
Relevant services provided to help the dignity of man or defence of the cause of freedom
Any public or private works which demonstrate selflessness and self-denial for the benefit of the community
Distinguished service in the field of sports

The President of East Timor may present the Order of Timor-Leste on his own initiative, by the proposal of the National Parliament, or by a proposal of the Council of Ministers.  The Minister of Defence and Security and the Chief of Staff of the Armed is consulted when the order is to be presented to East Timorese or foreign military personnel.  The Minister of Defence and Security and the General Commander of Timor-Leste's National Police Force is consulted whenever the order is to be presented to East Timorese or foreign members of police forces.  The Foreign Minister is consulted whenever the order is to be presented to a foreigner.

Grades
The Order of Timor-Leste is presented in four grades:
Grand Collar
Collar
Medal
Insignia

Each grade may only be bestowed once upon the same person.  The Grand Collar is bestowed exclusively on to Heads of sovereign States.  Upon the completion of their term of office those persons who have served as the President of the Republic are entitled to be awarded the Grand Collar of the Order of Timor-Leste.  The collar is granted on the day following the installation of the next President of the Republic.

The medal of the order may also be granted to communities, institutions, diplomats, police forces and units and military units.  The medal is granted to entities deemed worthy of recognition by way of an official report of the Council of Ministers, who have existed for at least 15 years and are likely to exist on into the future.  Military and police units are not held to this same standard.

Notable recipients

Grand Collar of the Order
Susilo Bambang Yudhoyono
Joko Widodo
Samora Machel
David Hurley
Marcelo Rebelo de Sousa

Collar of the Order
Mário Viegas Carrascalão (awarded 18 May 2017)
Sir Peter Cosgrove
Noam Chomsky

Medal of the Order
Judith Fergin
Sir Angus Houston
Timor Leste Defence Force
National Republican Guard (Portugal)
UN Police UNMIT
Mohamed Salama Badi
Max Stahl
East Timor and Indonesia Action Network

Insignia
Duarte Pio, Duke of Braganza

Unknown Class
 Aníbal Cavaco Silva
 Fernando de Araújo
 António Ramalho Eanes
 Jaime Gama
 Lee Chiong Giam (2012)
 Vicente Guterres
 Filomeno da Paixão de Jesus
 Gordon McIntosh
 José Ramos-Horta
 António Manuel Fernandes da Silva Ribeiro
 Taur Matan Ruak

See also
 Orders, decorations, and medals of Timor-Leste

References

Orders, decorations, and medals of East Timor
Awards established in 2009
2009 establishments in East Timor